The Yorkshire Combination was an association football league covering Yorkshire, England.

History
The Yorkshire Combination was formed for the 1910–11 season, and the inaugural champions were Bradford City reserves. The league ran for four seasons before being disbanded in 1914.

References

 
1910 establishments in England
Defunct football leagues in England
Football competitions in Yorkshire
1914 disestablishments in England
Sports leagues established in 1910
Sports leagues disestablished in 1914